Wild Nothing is an American indie rock/dream pop band from Blacksburg, Virginia, formed in late 2009 by Jack Tatum. During live performances, Tatum is joined by additional musicians, currently Nic Hessler (guitar), Jeff Haley (bass), Joshua Sushman (keyboards, saxophone) and Cameron Allen (drums).

To date, Wild Nothing has released four studio albums, Gemini (2010), Nocturne (2012), Life of Pause (2016) and Indigo (2018), and three EPs, Golden Haze (2010), Empty Estate (2013) and Laughing Gas (2020).

History
John Alexander Tatum (born June 10, 1988) previously played in bands Jack and the Whale and FACEPAINT in the college town of Blacksburg. He began recording under the name Wild Nothing in the summer of 2009. Emerging at a time when a handful of C86-esque groups were in vogue, Tatum's demos garnered attention in indie music circles with a cover of Kate Bush's "Cloudbusting". Tatum signed with the Captured Tracks record label after the success of these demos, and began touring with Haley, Goodman and drummer Max Brooks.

Wild Nothing's first single, "Summer Holiday," was released on Captured Tracks in 2009, followed by "Cloudbusting." The band's debut full-length, Gemini, was released in the spring of 2010. Gemini was ranked the 49th best album of 2010 by Pitchfork and 36th best album of 2010 by Amazon music editors. Blogcritics wrote, "While I wasn't totally convinced with Gemini as a whole, I adored it in chunks".

Follow-up EP Golden Haze was released in October 2010.

Wild Nothing released their second album, Nocturne, on August 28, 2012, via Captured Tracks. The album was well received critically and commercially, debuting at No. 1 on both the Billboard New Artist and Alternative New Artist charts, receiving "Best New Music" from Pitchfork, and receiving top slots on the year-end lists of Under the Radar and iTunes Alternative.

Wild Nothing's next EP, Empty Estate, was released on May 14, 2013.

On October 7, 2014, Wild Nothing announced the production of their third studio album. On January 6, 2015, Tatum announced that he was en route to Stockholm to begin recording.

In the same year, they were featured in the shoegazing documentary, Beautiful Noise.

On November 24, 2015, Wild Nothing announced their third studio album, Life of Pause, would be released on February 19, 2016, on Captured Tracks. A double-sided single, "To Know You"/"TV Queen", was released the same day, with accompanying music videos for both tracks.

Wild Nothing announced their fourth studio album, Indigo, alongside the first single, "Letting Go", on June 5, 2018. The album was released on August 31, 2018.

On January 16, 2019, their single "Blue Wings" was released. The following year, Wild Nothing also announced  "Foyer" would be out on January 1, 2020, later following Laughing Gas that went out at the end of the month on January 31, 2020.

Lineup

Founding member and songwriter Tatum records Wild Nothing's albums and EPs alone, and is subsequently joined by the other members for live performances. In 2013, he stated: "I'm not really sure what we are at this point. It's a weird gray area. On the road, it definitely feels like a band; the live show's all about how we individually interpret the songs I made – there's five different takes on them. But the records are all me. Gemini was all me, and so was Nocturne, save for the drums."

Current
Jeff Haley – bass guitar (2010–present)
Nic Hessler – guitar (2018–present)
Cameron Allen – drums (2018–present)
Joshua Sushman – keyboards/saxophone (2018–present)

Former
Nathan Goodman – guitar 
Elroy Finn – drums 
Matt Kallman – keyboards 
Colin Caulfield – keyboards (2017)
Jeremiah Johnson – drums
Kevin Knight – keyboards
Michael Skattum – drums
Max Brooks – drums
Clay Violand – bass guitar
Pete Chudzick – drums

Discography

Studio albums

Live albums

EPs

Singles
"Summer Holiday" (2009, Captured Tracks)
"Cloudbusting" (2009, Captured Tracks)
"Nowhere" (2012, Captured Tracks)
"Shadow" (2012, Captured Tracks)
"Paradise" (2012, Captured Tracks)
"A Dancing Shell" (2013, Captured Tracks)
"To Know You" (2015, Captured Tracks)
"TV Queen" (2015, Captured Tracks)
"Reichpop" (2016, Captured Tracks)
"Life of Pause" (2016, Captured Tracks)
"A Woman's Wisdom" (2016, Captured Tracks)
"Letting Go" (2018, Captured Tracks)
"Partners in Motion" (2018, Captured Tracks)
"Shallow Water" (2018, Captured Tracks)
"Canyon on Fire" (2018, Captured Tracks)
"Blue Wings" (2019, Captured Tracks)
"Foyer" (2020, Captured Tracks)

References

External links
Official Website

Indie rock musical groups from Virginia
Musical groups established in 2009
Captured Tracks artists